The 2020 Georgia State Senate election was held on November 3, 2020. Georgia voters elected state senators in all 56 of the state senate's districts to the 156th Georgia General Assembly for two-year terms in the Georgia State Senate. The elections coincided with the 2020 United States presidential election, 2020 United States House of Representatives elections, 2020 Georgia House of Representatives election, and more.

Predictions

Closest races 
Seats where the margin of victory was under 10%:

Results

District 1

District 2

District 3

District 4

District 5

District 6

District 7

District 8

District 9

District 10

District 11

District 12

District 13

District 14

District 15

District 16

District 17

District 18

District 19

District 20

District 21

District 22

District 23

District 24

District 25

District 26

District 27

District 28

District 29

District 30

District 31

District 32

District 33

District 34

District 35

District 36

District 37

District 38

District 39 
Incumbent senator Nikema Williams resigned to run for Georgia's 5th congressional district, which John Lewis represented until his death. A special primary took place on November 3, 2020, and a runoff took place December 1, 2020. No Republican had filed to face Williams in the general election, so the special primary acted as the general election.

District 40

District 41

District 42

District 43

District 44

District 45

District 46

District 47

District 48

District 49

District 50

District 51

District 52

District 53

District 54

District 55

District 56

Notes

References 

State Senate
Georgia State Senate elections
Georgia Senate